Helicopsis lunulata is a species of air-breathing land snail, terrestrial pulmonate gastropod mollusc in the family Geomitridae from Eastern Europe.

Taxonomy
Before 2020 Helicopsis lunulata was considered to be a synonym of Helicopsis striata and most of its populations were assigned to the latter species, though some large forms were treated as a separate species Helicopsis instabilis (Rossmässler, 1838).

Helicopsis cereoflava (Bielz, 1851) from Romania is probably a synonym of this species.

Distribution

This species occurs in following countries:
 Ukraine
 Moldova
 Romania
 Russia
 Poland (probably)
 Germany (invasive, one colony)

References

External links
 Rossmässler, E. A. (1838-1844). Iconographie der Land- & Süßwasser- Mollusken, mit vorzüglicher Berücksichtigung der europäischen noch nicht abgebildeten Arten
 Clessin, S. (1879). Aus meiner Novitäten-Mappe. Malakozoologische Blätter. Neue Folge. 1: 3–16

Geomitridae
Molluscs described in 1833